Preview is the built-in image viewer and PDF viewer of the macOS operating system. In addition to viewing and printing digital images and Portable Document Format (PDF) files, it can also edit these media types. It employs the Aqua graphical user interface, the Quartz graphics layer, and the ImageIO and Core Image frameworks.

History
Like macOS, Preview originated in the NeXTSTEP operating system by NeXT, where it was part of every release since 1989. Between 2003 and 2005, Apple claimed Preview was the "fastest PDF viewer on the planet."

Supported file types
Preview can open the following file types.

 AI – Adobe Illustrator artwork files (if PDF content included in file)
 BMP – Windows bitmap files
 CR2 – Raw image file used by Canon cameras
 DAE – Collada 3D files
 DNG – Digital negative files
 FAX – Faxes
 FPX – FlashPix files
 GIF – Graphics Interchange Format files
 HDR – High-dynamic-range image files
 ICNS – Apple Icon Image files
 ICO – Windows icon files
 JPEG – Joint Photographic Experts Group files
 JPEG 2000 – JPEG 2000 files
 OBJ – Wavefront 3D file
 OpenEXR – OpenEXR files
 PDF – Portable Document Format version 1.5 + some additional features
 PICT – QuickDraw image files
 PNG – Portable Network Graphics files
 PPM – Netpbm Color Image files
 PNTG – MacPaint Bitmap Graphic files
 PPT – PowerPoint files
 PSD – Adobe Photoshop files
 QTIF – QuickTime image files
 RAD – Radiance 3D Scene Description files
 RAW – Raw image files
 SGI – Silicon Graphics Image files
 STL – STereoLithography 3D format
 TGA – TARGA image files
 TIF (TIFF) – Tagged Image File Format files
 XBM – X BitMap files

In macOS Monterey and earlier, Preview supported the display of EPS and PostScript documents using on-the-fly conversion to PDF format. However, this functionality was removed in macOS Ventura, although users can continue to print  and  files by dragging them into the printer queue. 

The version of Preview included with OS X 10.3 (Panther) could play animated GIF images, for which an optional button could be added to the toolbar. As of OS X 10.4 (Tiger), Preview lost playback functionality and animated GIF files are displayed as individual frames in a numbered sequence.

Features

Editing PDF documents

Preview can encrypt PDF documents, and restrict their use; for example, it is possible to save an encrypted PDF so that a password is required to copy data from the document, or to print it. However, encrypted PDFs cannot be edited further, so the original author should always keep an unencrypted version. A new "edit button" where the picture can be edited is introduced in Version 7. The "edit button" allows options to insert shapes, lines, do cropping, and among other things.

Some features which are otherwise only available in professional PDF editing software are provided by Preview: It is possible to extract single pages out of multi-page documents (e.g. PDF files), sort pages, and drag & drop single or multiple pages between several opened multi-page documents, or into other applications, such as attaching to an opened email message.

Editing images
Preview offers basic image correction tools using Core Image processing technology implemented in macOS, and other features like shape extraction, color extraction, cropping, and rotation tools. When annotating images, Preview uses vector shapes and text until the image is rasterized to JPEG, PNG or another bitmap format. PDF and image documents can also be supplied with keywords, and are then automatically indexed using macOS's system-wide Spotlight search engine.

Import and export
Preview can directly access image scanners supported by macOS and import images from the scanner. Preview can convert between image formats; it can export to BMP, JP2, JPEG, PDF, PICT, PNG, SGI, TGA, and TIFF. Using macOS's print engine (based on CUPS) it is also possible to "print into" a Postscript file, a PDF-X file or directly save the file in iPhoto, for example scanned photos.

Beginning with Mac OS X 10.7 Lion, Preview restricts the Format option popup menu in the Save As dialog to commonly used types.  It is possible to access the full format list by holding down the Option key when clicking the Format popup menu. (GIF, ICNS, JPEG, JPEG-2000, Microsoft BMP, Microsoft Icon, OpenEXR, PDF, Photoshop, PNG, SGI, TGA, TIFF.)

Issues
As of OS X 10.9.2, Preview does not support ISO-standardized PDF (ISO 32000), and when saving, destroys aspects of PDF files without warning to the user.

See also
 List of PDF software

References

External links
'Mac Basics: Preview app views and edits images and PDFs'
AppleInsider review from 2003
MacProNews article: PDF and Panther: The Hidden Role of PDF in Mac OS X 10.3 from July 2004
Sams Publishing sample chapter on Preview from Mac OS X Panther Applications and Utilities.  Includes some instructions for use, with screenshots.

Image viewers
PDF readers
MacOS